Christopher G. Turner (born October 10, 1972) is a Democratic member of the Texas House of Representatives, serving since 2013. Turner also served from 2008 to 2010. Turner previously worked for former Congressman Chet Edwards, and had a career as a public relations consultant. Turner was elected chair of the House Democratic Caucus in 2013, a position he held until 2023. Texas Democrats consider Turner a potential future statewide candidate.

References

External links
 
Legislative page
Twitter account

1972 births
21st-century American politicians
Democratic Party members of the Texas House of Representatives
Living people
People from Grand Prairie, Texas
People from Sherman, Texas
University of Texas at Austin alumni